The 2018 season is Washington Spirit sixth season, competing in the National Women's Soccer League, the top division of women's soccer in the United States. On August 21, the Spirit parted ways with Head Coach and General Manager Jim Gabarra, assistant coach Tom Torres took over as interim Head Coach for the remaining 3 games of the season.

Review
After a difficult 2017 season, the Spirit began rebuilding their team, continuing with a youth centered approach. Considered a successful 2018 draft, Washington recruited U.S. international Andi Sullivan (no. 1 overall pick) and Canadian international Rebecca Quinn (no. 3 overall pick). In addition to the draft, the Spirit traded Crystal Dunn's player rights for 2017 Rookie of the Year Ashley Hatch and rookie outside back Taylor Smith. The unfortunate folding of Boston Breakers allowed the Spirit to bring in U.S. international playmaker, Rose Lavelle via the subsequent dispersal draft. What seemed to be only key loss for the Spirit was captain and anchor centerback, Shelina Zadorsky, traded to Orlando Pride for promising goalkeeper, Aubrey Bledsoe.

The season opened with a loss to Seattle, but saw the return of Joanna Lohman, held back in 2017 through injury, and scored in her substitute appearance. After several mediocre performances in March and April, the Spirit would struggle for the remainder of the season, winning only one more match (of two all season) against struggling Sky Blue FC. A combination of injuries to forwards Mallory Pugh, Havana Solaun, and Arielle Ship hamstrung the Spirit attack who were shutout 15 matches (including a 7-match streak).

On August 21, after eight straight losses and being eliminated from playoff contention, the Spirit fired head coach, Jim Gabarra, and appointed assistant coach, Tom Torres as interim head coach. Torres lead the Spirit through the final three matches of the season at home, including the Spirit's debut at newly opened Audi Field against Portland Thorns on August 25. The match set a new club record for home attendance with 7,976 fans.

The last match of the season against Sky Blue FC, the Spirit ended a league-record setting goal drought at 765-minutes after Arielle Ship scored the opener of a 1–1 draw in the 71st minute. The match also earned Aubrey Bledsoe the league-wide record for saves in a single season at 108.

Club

Roster
The first-team roster of Washington Spirit.

 (FP)

 (FP)

 (INT)
 (FP)

 (INT)

 (FP) (DD)

 (DD)

 (FP) = Federation player
 (DD) = Dispersal draft player
 (INT) = International roster player

Team management

Source:

Competitions

Preseason

Regular season

Regular-season standings

Results summary

Results by round

NWSL Playoffs
The Spirit were eliminated from playoff contention on July 22 after a 1–0 home loss to Houston Dash.

Statistics

Appearances and goals

|-
|colspan="8"|Defenders:
|-

|-
|colspan="8"|Midfielders:
|-

|-
|colspan="8"|Forwards:
|-

|}

Italics indicates player left team midway through season.

Goalkeepers

Honors and awards

NWSL Yearly Awards

NWSL Team of the Month

NWSL Weekly Awards

NWSL Player of the Week

NWSL Goal of the Week

NWSL Save of the Week

Transfers

In

Out

Draft picks 
Draft picks are not automatically signed to the team roster. Only those who are signed to a contract will be listed as transfers in. Only trades involving draft picks and executed during the 2018 NWSL College Draft will be listed in the notes.

Notes

References

External links 
 

Washington Spirit seasons
Washington Spirit
Washington Spirit
2018 in sports in Maryland